Retinol dehydrogenase 8 is an enzyme that in humans is encoded by the RDH8 gene.

All-trans-retinol dehydrogenase (RDH8) is a visual cycle enzyme that reduces all-trans-retinal to all-trans-retinol in the presence of NADPH. It is a member of the short chain dehydrogenase/reductase family and is located in the outer segments of the photoreceptor cells; hence it is also known as photoreceptor retinol dehydrogenase. It is important in the visual cycle by beginning the rhodopsin regeneration pathway by reducing all-trans-retinal, the product of bleached and hydrolysed rhodopsin. This is a rate-limiting step in the visual cycle.[supplied by OMIM]

References

Further reading